, there were about 9,000 electric vehicles registered in Wisconsin.

Government policy
, the state government offers tax rebates of up to $1,000 for electric vehicle purchases.

, the state government charges a $100 registration fee for electric vehicles, and $75 for plug-in hybrid vehicles.

Charging stations
, there were 380 public charging stations in Wisconsin.

The Infrastructure Investment and Jobs Act, signed into law in November 2021, allocates  to charging stations in Wisconsin.

In June 2022, the state government released a plan to recognize I-90, I-94, I-43, I-41, I-535, US-53, and US-151 as alternative fuel corridors. Around half of all public charging stations in the state are within one mile of a corridor.

By region

Eau Claire
, less than 1% of vehicles registered in Eau Claire were electric.

Madison
, there were 2,227 electric vehicles registered in Dane County.

Milwaukee
, there were 1,320 electric vehicles registered in Milwaukee County.

References

Wisconsin
Road transportation in Wisconsin